The Wonderful World of Jazz is an album by pianist and composer John Lewis recorded for the Atlantic label in 1960.

Reception

Allmusic awarded the album 4½ stars stating it is "one of pianist John Lewis' most rewarding albums outside of his work with the Modern Jazz Quartet".

Track listing
All compositions by John Lewis except as indicated
 "Body and Soul" (Frank Eyton, Johnny Green, Edward Heyman, Robert Sour) - 15:24
 "I Should Care" (Sammy Cahn, Axel Stordahl, Paul Weston) - 4:50
 "Two Degrees East, Three Degrees West" - 5:35
 "Afternoon in Paris" - 9:55
 "I Remember Clifford" (Benny Golson) - 3:25
 "The Stranger" (Arif Mardin) - 5:39 Bonus track on CD reissue
 "If You Could See Me Now" (Tadd Dameron, Carl Sigman) - 10:21 Bonus track on CD reissue
Recorded in New York City on July 29, 1960 (tracks 2, 3 & 5), September 8, 1960 (track 1), and September 9, 1960 (tracks 4, 6 & 7)

Personnel 
John Lewis - piano, arranger
Jim Hall - guitar
George Duvivier - bass 
Connie Kay - drums
Herb Pomeroy - trumpet (tracks 1, 4 & 6)
Gunther Schuller - French horn (tracks 4 & 6)
Eric Dolphy - alto saxophone (tracks 4 & 6)
Benny Golson (tracks 4 & 6), Paul Gonsalves (track 1) - tenor saxophone
James Rivers - baritone saxophone (tracks 4 & 6)
Arif Mardin - arranger (track 6)

References 

 

1961 albums
John Lewis (pianist) albums
Albums produced by Nesuhi Ertegun
Albums produced by Tom Dowd
Atlantic Records albums